Solaria cuspidata is a species of flowering plant in the amaryllis family, Amaryllidaceae. It is endemic to the Coquimbo region of Chile.

References

Allioideae
Endemic flora of Chile